The Black Tide is a 1982 thriller novel by the British writer Hammond Innes. It was published in America the following year by Doubleday. After his wife dies following the wreck of an oil tanker on the Cornish coast, a former merchant seamen investigates.

References

Bibliography
 James Vinson & D. L. Kirkpatrick. Contemporary Novelists. St. James Press, 1986.

1982 British novels
Novels by Hammond Innes
British thriller novels
Novels set in Cornwall
William Collins, Sons books